Professional Squash Doubles is played with two players on each team. It is governed by The Squash Doubles Association (SDA) Pro Tour.  The men's professional doubles started in 1938, while the women's professional doubles association formed in 2007.

Men's Professional Doubles 

Professional doubles started in 1938 at The Heights Casino in Brooklyn, NY.  It had a viable tour starting in the late 1970s with events located in both the United States and Canada.  In 2000, the doubles pro tour rebranded itself with the new name, International Squash Doubles Association (ISDA), and again in 2012 as The Squash Doubles Association Pro Tour (SDA Pro Tour).  It is the governing body responsible for the men's world professional squash doubles tour and celebrated its 75th anniversary of professional doubles in 2013.

Women's Professional Doubles 

Since the Women's Doubles Squash Association (WDSA) formed in 2007, it has reached several of its goals. It has increased the number of women playing professional and amateur doubles and encouraged former college players, current teaching professionals and WISPA touring professionals to play.

In addition to the tour growth, with stops throughout the United States and Canada, the WDSA has helped foster and build women's doubles on the amateur level which has been achieved through pro-am tournaments and Under 30 events at local clubs.

The WDSA, corporate partners, patrons and membership have established relationships with local charities throughout the United States – City Squash, METRO squash, Mile High Squash and Squash Haven – all urban squash programs.

Top international female singles players who have made the successful transition to doubles and their highest WISPA ranking:

Natalie Grainger	USA	#1
Narelle Krizek	AUSTRALIA	#23
Suzie Pierrepont	ENGLAND	#23
Amanda Sobhy	USA	#17 (World Junior Champion)

Major Professional Results

North American Open

U.S. Pro

Johnson

The Elite

Cambridge Club

Gold Racquet

Buffalo Invitational

External links 
 ISDA website
 WDSA website

References

Squash (sport)